Sinuessa is a genus of lace bugs in the family Tingidae. There are about eight described species in Sinuessa.

Species
These eight species belong to the genus Sinuessa:
 Sinuessa colens (Drake, 1953)
 Sinuessa colentis (Drake, 1953)
 Sinuessa deianira Linnavuori, 1977
 Sinuessa minor (Duarte Rodrigues, 1977)
 Sinuessa nairobia Drake, 1957
 Sinuessa parva Stusák, 1984
 Sinuessa subinermis (Horváth, 1910)
 Sinuessa waelbroecki (Schouteden in Bergroth and Schouteden, 1905)

References

Further reading

 
 
 
 
 
 
 
 
 
 
 

Tingidae
Articles created by Qbugbot